Arno Clemens Gaebelein (August 27, 1861 – December, 1945) was a Methodist minister in the United States.  He was a prominent teacher and conference speaker. He was also the father of educator and philosopher of Christian education Frank E. Gaebelein.

Career

Being a dispensationalist, he was a developer of the movement in its early days.  Two of his books, Revelation, an Analysis and Exposition and Current Events in the Light of the Bible explain the dispensationalist view of eschatology.

Gaebelein did not support the Christian Zionists in their alliance with the World Zionist Organization. In a 1905 speech, he stated:

In 1899, Gaebelein left the Methodist Episcopal Church because of its theological liberalism. George Marsden notes that he was one of the early fundamentalist leaders to advocate ecclesiastical separation.

Gaebelein was an advocate of gap creationism. He also was the editor of Our Hope, a Christian periodical, for a number of years, and was a close assistant to Dr. C. I. Scofield on his monumental work, the Scofield Reference Bible.

The Principles of the Hope of Israel Moment

In the Nov-Dec 1896 issue of "Our Hope" one of the best statements of Hebrew Christians (Messianic Jews) was written under the heading, The Principles of the Hope of Israel Moment.

Works
Revelation, and Analysis and Exposition
Current Events in the Light of the Bible
The Annotated Bible, a commentary on the Old and New Testaments which Gaebelein described as a 'Bible study course'.
The Harmony of the Prophetic Word, a key to old testament prophecy concerning things to come. (1903)
The Prophet Daniel (1911)
The Jewish Question (1912)
Christ and Glory (1918)
The Healing Question (1925)
The Christ We Know (1927)
The Conflict of the Ages:  The Mystery of Lawlessness: Its Origin, Historic Development and Coming Defeat (1933)
The History of the Scofield Reference Bible (1943)
The Prophet Ezekiel: an analytical Exposition (1972)
Meat In Due Season (nd)

References

External links
 
 
 The Annotated Bible by Arno C. Gaebelein
 Arno C. Gaebelein's biography at the Pre-Trib Research Center

1861 births
1945 deaths
American Christian creationists
Christian fundamentalists
Editors of Christian publications
German emigrants to the United States
Methodist ministers